Macomb's Dam Bridge is a 1935 oil painting by the American Realist artist Edward Hopper. The work depicts New York City's Macombs Dam Bridge; the scene is quiet and empty in contrast to the bridge's usual traffic. It is in the collection of the Brooklyn Museum, New York City.

See also
 List of works by Edward Hopper

References

Paintings by Edward Hopper
1935 paintings